The 1969 Colorado Buffaloes football team represented the University of Colorado in the Big Eight Conference during the 1969 NCAA University Division football season. Led by seventh-year head coach Eddie Crowder, Colorado finished the regular season at 7–3 (5–2 in Big 8, third), and played their home games on campus at Folsom Field in Boulder, Colorado.

Invited to the Liberty Bowl in Memphis, Tennessee, the Buffs defeated Alabama 47–33 to complete the season at 8–3; CU outscored its opponents 276 to 227 and climbed to sixteenth in the final AP poll.

Schedule

Personnel

Roster

Coaching staff
 Head coach: Eddie Crowder
 Assistants: Chet Franklin (OC), Don James (DC), Ken Blair (DE), Rick Duval (WR), C.B. McGowan (backs), Jim Mora (DL), Steve Ortmayer (OL), Steve Sidwell (LB), Augie Tammariello (OL), Dan Stavely (Freshmen)

Starters
 Offense: QB Jim Batten/Paul Arendt, TB Bobby Anderson, FB Ward Walsh, WR Bob Matsen, SE Monte Huber, TE Mike Pruett, TT Jim Phillips, TG Dick Melin, C Don Popplewell, SG Dennis Havig, ST Eddie Fusiek
 Defense: LE Herb Ovis, LT Dave Perini/Bill Collins, RT Dave Capra, RE Bill Brundige, OLB Bill Blanchard, MLB Phil Iriwn, OLB Rick Ogle, LCB Jim Cooch, LS Pat Murphy, RS Pete Jacobsen, RCB Eric Harris
 Specialists: PK Dave Haney, P Dick Robert

NFL Draft
Three Buffaloes were selected in the 1970 NFL Draft, which was seventeen rounds (442 selections).

References

External links
University of Colorado Athletics – 1969 football roster
Sports Reference – 1969 Colorado football season

Colorado
Colorado Buffaloes football seasons
Liberty Bowl champion seasons
Colorado Buffaloes football